Walter Harry Gummery (1 May 1900–1979) was an English footballer who played in the Football League for Accrington Stanley and Wolverhampton Wanderers.

References

1900 births
1974 deaths
English footballers
Association football forwards
English Football League players
Worcester City F.C. players
Wolverhampton Wanderers F.C. players
Accrington Stanley F.C. (1891) players